The 1991 World Snooker Championship (also referred to as the 1991 Embassy World Snooker Championship for the purposes of sponsorship) was a professional ranking snooker tournament that took place between 20 April and 6 May 1991 at the Crucible Theatre in Sheffield, England.

Stephen Hendry was the defending champion, but he lost in the quarter-finals to Steve James and thus fell to the Crucible curse, becoming another champion who was unable to defend his first world title.

John Parrott won his only World Championship title by defeating Jimmy White 18–11 in the final. It was the third time that White had lost in the final after 1984 and 1990. The tournament was sponsored by cigarette manufacturer Embassy.

The highest break of the tournament was 140, made by Jimmy White.

Tournament summary
 Future champion Ken Doherty made his Crucible debut, losing to Steve Davis 8–10; former champion Joe Johnson qualified for the last time, losing to Dennis Taylor 6–10. Both of these were first-round matches.
Future three-time semi-finalist Alan McManus also made his debut this year. He came through five rounds of qualifying and reached the second round at the Crucible, where he narrowly lost 12–13 to Terry Griffiths.
 Ray Reardon the six time world champion announced his retirement from the game after losing his second round qualifying match 10–5 to Jason Prince. Reardon was a professional since 1967.
 Cliff Thorburn failed to qualify for the first time, after playing in every championship since 1973.
In the 4th frame of his first round match against Doug Mountjoy, Gary Wilkinson potted 15 reds and 15 blacks to make a break of 120. With all 6 colours on their spots, Wilkinson had a golden chance of clinching a 147 maximum break and a £100,000 prize, but Wilkinson then missed the yellow, which wobbled in the jaws of the pocket. 
The 14th frame of the second round match between Steve Davis and Tony Meo took 70 minutes, including a 33-minute spell on just the final yellow and green. Meo won the frame by the bizarre score of 87–72, which included many foul points. Undeterred, Davis then won the next five frames to win 13–6.
One of the matches of the tournament was the second round match between Jimmy White and Neal Foulds. White took early leads of 3–0 and 4–2, but then fell 4–6 behind. In the 13th frame, when 5–7 behind, White made the highest break of the tournament, a 140. Foulds kept a one or two frame lead until he pulled three frames clear at 11–8. White then responded by winning five of the last six frames, including the final two frames, to win 13–12. White's quarter final against the in form Gary Wilkinson was expected to be a close affair, but White won 13–3.
 Defending champion Stephen Hendry lost to Steve James 11–13 in the quarter-finals, despite Hendry having led 11–9. Hendry would not suffer another defeat at the Crucible until the 1997 final against Ken Doherty.
 Steve Davis made his ninth semi-final in a row, a record that still stands, but lost 10–16 against John Parrott. In the other semi final between Jimmy White and Steve James, the first day of which was played on their 29th and 30th birthdays respectively, White won 16–9. 
John Parrott took a 7–0 lead against Jimmy White in the final with near flawless snooker in the first session, and although White reduced his arrears to 8–12 at one stage, Parrott eventually won 18–11, again with a seven frame advantage.

Prize fund
The breakdown of prize money for this year is shown below: 
 Winner: £135,000
 Runner-up: £80,000
 Semi-final: £42,000
 Quarter-final: £20,000
 Last 16: £11,000
 Last 32: £6,500
 Highest break: £12,000
 Maximum break: £100,000
 Total: £750,000

Main draw 
Shown below are the results for each round. The numbers in parentheses beside some of the players are their seeding ranks (each championship has 16 seeds and 16 qualifiers).

Qualifying rounds

1st qualifying round
 Rod Lawler 5–0  Derek Mienie
 Bill Werbeniuk w/o–w/d  Clive Everton
 Vladimir Potaznyk w/o–w/d  Jim Meadowcroft
 Jonathan Birch 10–4  Pascal Burke
 Chris Cookson 10–5  Derek Heaton
 Paul Thornley 10–7  Paddy Morgan
 Franky Chan 10–1  Ian Black
 Jason Ferguson 10–1  David Greaves
 Alan McManus 10–1  Billy Kelly
 Gary Natale 10–3  Bert Demarco
 Jason Whittaker 10–2  Bernard Bennett
 Jason Prince 10–4  Fred Davis
 Ken Doherty w/o–w/d  Patsy Fagan

2nd qualifying round
 Rod Lawler 10–5  Anthony Harris
 Jack Fitzmaurice 10–9  Marcel Gauvreau
 Mick Price 10–1  Bill Werbeniuk
 Vladimir Potaznyk 10–4  Graham Cripsey
 Jonathan Birch 10–4  Kirk Stevens
 Mario Morra 10–5  Vic Harris
 Tony Wilson 10–2  Dennis Hughes
 Jon Wright 10–0  Mike Watterson
 Ian Brumby 10–4  Terry Whitthread
 Chris Cookson 10–1  Roger Bales
 John Rea 10–9  Robby Foldvari
 Jason Smith 10–9  Jim Bear
 Paul Medati 10–7  Ian Williamson
 Ray Edmonds 10–3  Paul Thornley
 Eddie Sinclair 10–4  Malcolm Bradley
 Nick Terry 10–8  Franky Chan
 Steve Campbell 10–4  Tony Kearney
 Dave Gilbert 10–3  Dessie Sheehan
 Bob Harris 10–5  Mike Darrington
 Joe Grech 10–1  John Dunning
 Jason Ferguson 10–4  Pat Houlihan
 Alan McManus 10–6  Tommy Murphy
 Steve Meakin 10–6  Graham Miles
 Barry Pinches 10–3  Jim Donnelly
 Andrew Cairns 10–2  Gary Natale
 Paul Gibson w/o–w/d  Paul Watchorn
 Jason Whittaker 10–8  Stephen Murphy
 Bill Oliver 10–7  Duncan Campbell
 George Scott 10–7  Mick Fisher
 Jason Prince 10–5  Ray Reardon
 Ken Doherty 10–9  Martin Smith
 Ken Owers 10–2  Matt Gibson

3rd qualifying round
 Rod Lawler 10–4  Brian Rowswell
 Warren King 10–3  Jack Fitzmaurice
 Mick Price 10–4  Jack McLaughlin
 Les Dodd 10–3  Vladimir Potaznyk
 Ian Graham 10–7  Jonathan Birch
 Mario Morra 10–8  David Taylor
 Robert Marshall 10–9  Tony Wilson
 Mark Johnston-Allen 10–0  Jon Wright
 Brian Morgan 10–3  Ian Brumby
 Chris Cookson 10–4  Murdo MacLeod
 Mark Bennett 10–5  John Rea
 Jason Smith 10–8  Jim Chambers
 Darren Morgan 10–5  Paul Medati
 Ray Edmonds 10–4  John Spencer
 Nick Dyson 10–8  Eddie Sinclair
 Mark Rowing 10–6  Nick Terry
 Nigel Gilbert 10–8  Steve Campbell
 John Campbell 10–8  Dave Gilbert
 Bob Harris 10–9  Steve Longworth
 Jim Wych 10–1  Joe Grech
 Jason Ferguson 10–9  Tony Chappel
 Alan McManus 10–6  David Roe
 Steve Meakin w/o–w/d  Joe O'Boye
 Barry Pinches 10–6  Brady Gollan
 Tony Jones 10–6  Andrew Cairns
 Steve Duggan 10–7  Paul Gibson
 Eugene Hughes 10–6  Jason Whittaker
 Nigel Bond 10–2  Bill Oliver
 Craig Edwards 10–3  George Scott
 Jason Prince 10–9  Colin Roscoe
 Ken Doherty 10–4  Rex Williams
 Paddy Browne 10–6  Ken Owers

4th qualifying round
 Warren King 10–7  Rod Lawler
 Les Dodd 10–7  Mick Price
 Ian Graham 10–7  Mario Morra
 Robert Marshall 10–9  Mark Johnston-Allen
 Chris Cookson 10–4  Brian Morgan
 Mark Bennett 10–6  Jason Smith
 Ray Edmonds 10–7  Darren Morgan
 Nick Dyson 10–3  Mark Rowing
 Nigel Gilbert 10–9  John Campbell
 Jim Wych 10–7  Bob Harris
 Alan McManus 10–6  Jason Ferguson
 Barry Pinches 10–8  Steve Meakin
 Tony Jones 10–5  Steve Duggan
 Nigel Bond 10–5  Eugene Hughes
 Craig Edwards 10–6  Jason Prince
 Ken Doherty 10–6  Paddy Browne

5th qualifying round
 Warren King 10–2  Barry West
 Steve Newbury 10–1  Les Dodd
 Ian Graham 10–7  Dene O'Kane
 Robert Marshall 10–9  Peter Francisco
 Gary Wilkinson 10–2  Chris Cookson
 Mark Bennett 10–8  Wayne Jones
 Eddie Charlton 10–2  Ray Edmonds
 Nick Dyson 10–5  Cliff Thorburn
 Nigel Gilbert 10–8  Bob Chaperon
 Tony Knowles 10–2  Jim Wych
 Alan McManus 10–8  Tony Drago
 Barry Pinches 10–5  Danny Fowler
 Tony Jones 10–6  Silvino Francisco
 Joe Johnson 10–8  Nigel Bond
 Craig Edwards 10–8  James Wattana
 Ken Doherty 10–5  Cliff Wilson

Century breaks
There were 31 century breaks in the championship. The highest break of the tournament was 140 made by Jimmy White.

 140, 138, 136, 117, 115  Jimmy White
 138, 137, 131, 122, 117, 112, 112, 101  John Parrott
 137  Alan McManus
 135, 126, 106, 102  Steve James
 135, 122, 116, 105, 102, 100  Stephen Hendry

 123, 114  Tony Meo
 120, 112  Gary Wilkinson
 106  Dean Reynolds
 103  Martin Clark
 102  Tony Jones

References

1991
World Championship
World Snooker Championship
Sports competitions in Sheffield
World Snooker Championship
World Snooker Championship